Skoura M'Daz is a small town and rural commune in Boulemane Province of the Fès-Meknès region of Morocco. At the time of the 2004 census, the commune had a total population of 8713 people living in 1934 households.

Commune Places 
 Aït Hamou Yahya
 Aït Wahyan
 Aman Ilila
 Bouassem
 Ichen Aaki
 L'hersh
 Sidi Mehyo
 Tadout
 Taghrout
 Tajjin
 Tikhzanin
 Tizi l'Qlib
 (...)

References

Populated places in Boulemane Province
Rural communes of Fès-Meknès